The 1957 Navy Midshipmen football team represented the United States Naval Academy (USNA) as an independent during the 1957 NCAA University Division football season. Led by eighth-year head coach Eddie Erdelatz, the Midshipmen shut out #10 Army 14–0 to end the regular season at 8–1–1; they were ranked fifth in the final polls, released in early December.

In December, Navy won its third Lambert Trophy, an award for the season's best college football team in the East. The Middies had previously won the award in 1943 and 1954. Navy and the small-college winner of the Lambert Cup, Lehigh, were lauded as proof that a university could field a competitive football team without compromising its academic standards.

Favored by a point, Navy won the Cotton Bowl 20–7 over eighth-ranked Rice on New Year's Day.

Schedule

Personnel

References

Navy
Navy Midshipmen football seasons
Lambert-Meadowlands Trophy seasons
Cotton Bowl Classic champion seasons
Navy Midshipmen football